Radoslav Kropáč (born 4 April 1975) is a Slovak former professional ice hockey player.

Kropáč was drafted 260th overall by the New York Rangers in the 1994 NHL Entry Draft but never played in North America. He played in the Slovak Extraliga with HC Slovan Bratislava, MHk 32 Liptovský Mikuláš, MsHK Žilina, HK Nitra and HK 36 Skalica and the Czech Extraliga for HC Havířov Panthers, HC Bílí Tygři Liberec, HC Pardubice, HC Slavia Praha, HC Oceláři Třinec, HC České Budějovice and HC Vítkovice. He also played one season in the SM-liiga in Finland for JYP as well as a brief spell in the Russian Superleague for Salavat Yulaev Ufa.

Kropáč was a member of the Slovakia national team for the 1998 IIHF World Championship.

Career statistics

References

External links

1975 births
Living people
HC Bílí Tygři Liberec players
Bratislava Capitals players
HC Dynamo Pardubice players
HC Havířov players
JYP Jyväskylä players
MHk 32 Liptovský Mikuláš players
Motor České Budějovice players
New York Rangers draft picks
HK Nitra players
HC Nové Zámky players
HC Oceláři Třinec players
Salavat Yulaev Ufa players
HK 36 Skalica players
HC Slavia Praha players
Slovak ice hockey right wingers
HC Slovan Bratislava players
HK Spišská Nová Ves players
Ice hockey people from Bratislava
GKS Tychy (ice hockey) players
HC Vítkovice players
MsHK Žilina players
Slovak expatriate ice hockey players in Finland
Slovak expatriate ice hockey players in Russia
Slovak expatriate ice hockey players in the Czech Republic
Slovak expatriate sportspeople in Austria
Slovak expatriate sportspeople in Poland
Expatriate ice hockey players in Austria
Expatriate ice hockey players in Poland